Roger Karl Evald Norman (2 August 1928 – 29 November 1995) was a Swedish triple jumper. He won a silver medal at the 1954 European Athletics Championships and finished eighth at the 1952 Summer Olympics.

Norman was the Swedish triple jump champion in 1952–58. After retiring from competitions he stayed with his club Västerås IK as a sports administrator.

References

1928 births
1995 deaths
Swedish male triple jumpers
Olympic athletes of Sweden
Athletes (track and field) at the 1952 Summer Olympics
European Athletics Championships medalists
Sportspeople from Västerås